This page provides summaries to the 2003 COSAFA Cup.

First round
Winners of the first round advanced to the quarter-finals.

Quarter-finals
The four quarter-finalists of the 2002 edition South Africa, Malawi, Swaziland and Zambia received byes into quarter-finals.

Semi-finals

Final

External links
 Details at RSSSF archives

COSAFA Cup
COSAFA Cup